The Jubba Basin, also called Goobweyn Hoose, is a drainage outlet in Jubaland, Somalia and is the point at which the River Jubba meets the Somali Sea. Since the Shebelle River's outlet joins Jubba as a tributary, it is also the outlet of the Shebelle River.

History 
Due to tree-cutting at the mouth of the basin, concerns have been raised about the sustainability of the ecology in the area. Goobweyn is located 14km north of Kismaayo, the economic capital of Jubaland. During the 1990s, the SPM Harti previously held a base in the Goobweyn region, and it was this faction which would go on to create Jubaland, which it saw as a revival of the former British Jubaland.

See also 
Shebelle River

References

basin 
Jubaland